Dhamrai Hardinge School & College in a school in Dhamrai, Dhaka, Bangladesh.

History 
The school was established in 1914 as Dhamrai Hardinge School. Founded by Charles Hardinge, 1st Baron Hardinge of Penshurst, former Governor-General of India.

The school was nationalized in 2018.

Academics 
The school offers primary and secondary education for boys and girls even though it is non-co-educational. Generally boys and girls are split into separate shifts. There are two shifts morning and day. The 100 years anniversary of this school was celebrated in 2017.

References 

Schools in Dhaka District
1914 establishments in India